Inter United FC was a short-lived American amateur soccer club based in Tukwila, Washington. The team competed in the National Premier Soccer League for one season in 2014 as a founding member of the Northwest Conference. Inter United FC was led by Nasir Tura, a varsity soccer coach at Foster High School in Tukwila and director of the Seattle Community Cup.

Stadium 
The team played at Werner L. Neudorf Stadium in Tukwila, Washington. The facility, which was built in 2002, features an artificial playing surface and seating for 3,000 fans.

References

External links
Official team website

Association football clubs established in 2008
National Premier Soccer League teams
Soccer clubs in Washington (state)
2008 establishments in Washington (state)
Defunct soccer clubs in Washington (state)